= Fellowship League =

High school athletics league in California, USA

The Fellowship League is a high school athletic league that is part of the CIF Southern Section. It does not sponsor football.

== Schools ==
Schools for the 2014–15 basketball season are:

- Waldorf School of Orange County
- Christbridge Academy
- Carson Christian School
- Arroyo Pacific Academy
- Harvest Christian Academy
- Gateway Christian Academy
- Orange County Christian School
- New Life Christian School
